Muhammad Ssegirinya is an opposition member of the Ugandan parliament representing Kawempe north.

Background and education 
He was born in 1988 in Butale, Kadugala, Masaka District, Uganda. He attended Pimbas secondary school for his middle and high school education. He later graduated with a Diploma in Journalism from Datamine Technical Business School and a Masters in the Science of Service
Delivery from Musa Body University.

Work experience 
Ssegirinya is a professional journalist and member of the Ugandan parliament. He served as the lord councillor for Kampala capital city representing the people of Kyebando from 2016 to 2020.

Political career 
In 2011 Ssegirinya contested Kawempe north parliamentary seat, but lost the vote. He contested in the 2016 Forum for Democratic Change party primaries for Kawempe north parliamentary seat, but he lost. He contested for a position of councillor representing Kawempe North at kampala cityhall and won.

In 2021, Ssegirinya contested the Kawempe north constituency on the National Unity Platform (NUP) political party ticket, he won. His victory was challenged in court by one of his contenders but the case was dismissed and court declared him winner.

Additional informational 
On 3 September 2021, Ssegirinya was summoned by Uganda police force to appear before the Criminal Investigation Department for questioning over his alleged involvement in rebel activities in Greater Masaka region.

On 7 September 2021, Masaka Chief Magistrate's court has remanded  him with four counts, three of murder and one of attempted murder. He was Kitalya Maximum Security Prison.

References

External links 

 Website of the Parliament of Uganda

Living people
1988 births
Members of the Parliament of Uganda
National Unity Platform politicians
People from Kampala